The 2006 NBA Development League Draft was the sixth annual draft by the NBA Development League. It was held on November 2, 2006.

Key

Draft

Round 1

Round 2

Round 3

Round 4

Round 5

References

NBA G League draft
draft